The Nowy Tomyśl Wind Turbines are wind turbines which used to be the tallest in the world. They are situated in Paproć, a village near Nowy Tomyśl in Poland and were erected in 2012. Each of these two wind turbines has a generating capacity of 2500 kW. Both rotors have a diameter of 100 metres and are mounted on 160 metre tall free-standing lattice towers, which are the tallest free-standing lattice towers in Poland.

The basement of each of these turbines weighs 1500 tons, the tower 350 tons and the gondola 100 tons.

Coordinates

References

Wind turbines
Wind farms in Poland
Buildings and structures in Greater Poland Voivodeship
Nowy Tomyśl County